A pincer gate is a gate in a fortification that is deeply embedded between two inward angled exterior walls. Those wishing to enter the fort have to approach what is in effect a sunken road and, if hostile, can be attacked from both side walls in a pincer fashion.

Pincer gates were already being used in Urnfield and Celtic fortification in Central Europe and may also be seen in Early Medieval circular ramparts. They were common well into the High Middle Ages.

Literature 

 Horst Wolfgang Böhme, Reinhard Friedrich, Barbara Schock-Werner: Wörterbuch der Burgen, Schlösser und Festungen. Philipp Reclam, Stuttgart, 2004, pp. 241–242.

See also 
Chamber gate

City walls
Fortification (architectural elements)